How the Other Half Lives is a book by Jacob Riis. How the Other Half Lives may also refer to:

 "How the Other Half Lives", a song from the 2002 stage musical Thoroughly Modern Millie (musical)
 How the Other Half Live, a 2009–10 British documentary series
 Eamonn & Ruth: How the Other Half Lives, a 2015–19 British documentary series

See also
 How the Other Half Dies, a 1976 book by Susan George
 How the Other Half Loves, a 1969 play by Alan Ayckbourn
 How the Other Half Banks, a 2015 book by Mehrsa Baradaran
 How the Other Half Live and Die, a 2016 album by Cold, Cold Heart (band)